The Shanghai Securities Journal (abbreviated as SSJ; 上海证券报; 上海證券報), or Shanghai Securities Post, officially titled as Shanghai Securities News, is a national securities daily newspaper in China, with headquarters in Shanghai. It is a China's state-owned newspaper with the official website at cnstock.com.

History
Shanghai Securities Journal was launched on July 1, 1991 (internal circulation),  and it has been openly issued in China and abroad since January 1, 1993.

References

Newspapers published in Shanghai
Newspapers published in China
Publications established in 1991
1991 establishments in China